Solacoglu Inn ( or Hanul Solacolu) improperly called inn, was actually a factory for producing pasta in Bucharest. It is located along Calea Moşilor, a trading avenue that used to make the connection between Bucharest's Inner Town (Romanian Târgul Dinlǎuntru) and the largest marketplace in the town (Obor Marketplace, still in use as of 2006). Its architecture blends traditional outlines with a few Western elements. It was constructed in 1859 for Solacoglu Brothers, merchants from Svishtov, Bulgaria who had settled in Wallachia. In the 1990s the city government evacuated the illegal inhabitants and the bureaucratic process of restoring the building was supposed to begin, but it did not. The building lies nowadays in a bad, ruined state, with its doors and windows blocked off by metal strings bars and plates.
During the war of independence from the Ottoman empire 1877. The head of the Bulgarian diaspora lived in the building. The Romanians and Bulgarians were allies in this war of liberation from the Ottomans.

Other old inns still standing in Bucharest include Manuc's Inn (Romanian: Hanul lui Manuc), Gabroveni Inn (Romanian: Hanul Gabroveni), and the Lindentree Inn (almost universally known by its Romanian name Hanul cu Tei).

References

External links
Solacolu Inn Website

Industrial buildings completed in 1859
Historic monuments in Bucharest